George Gerald Pullen (15 July 1873 – 14 June 1953) was an Australian politician. He was born in Sassafras, Tasmania. In 1912 he was elected to the Tasmanian House of Assembly as a Liberal member for Darwin. He was defeated in 1916 but re-elected as a Nationalist in 1919, this time representing Wilmot. He served until his second defeat in 1922. Pullen died in Barrington in 1953.

References

1873 births
1953 deaths
Commonwealth Liberal Party politicians
Nationalist Party of Australia members of the Parliament of Tasmania
Members of the Tasmanian House of Assembly